For the Avatar episode, see Nightmares and Daydreams (Avatar: The Last Airbender)

Nightmares and Daydreams is a collection of stories by author Nelson Bond. It was released in 1968 by Arkham House in an edition of 2,040 copies.  It was the author's first book to be published by Arkham House.  Most of the stories had previously appeared in the magazine Blue Book.

Contents

Nightmares and Daydreams contains the following tales:

 "To People a New World"
 "A Rosy Future for Roderick"
 "The Song"
 "Petersen's Eye"
 "The Abduction of Abner Greer"
 "Bird of Prey"
 "The Spinsters"
 "The Devil to Pay"
 "'Down Will Come the Sky'"
 "The Pet Shop"
 "Al Haddon's Lamp"
 "Last Inning"
 "The Dark Door"
 "Much Ado About Pending"
 "Final Report"

References

1968 short story collections
Fantasy short story collections
Science fiction short story collections by Nelson Bond